Tetramelasma is a genus of leafhoppers in the family Cicadellidae. They are endemic to South Africa.

Species
 Tetramelasma litopyx Stiller, 2011
 Tetramelasma nodosatha Stiller, 2011
 Tetramelasma scolosatha Stiller, 2011
 Tetramelasma tanyphysis Stiller, 2011

References

Deltocephalini
Cicadellidae genera
Endemic insects of South Africa